Cullen is a village and former royal burgh in Moray, Scotland, on the North Sea coast  east of Elgin. The village had a population of 1,327 in 2001. Cullen is noticeably busier in summer than winter due to the number of holiday homes owned. The organs of the wife of Robert the Bruce are said to have been buried in its old kirk (church) after her death in Cullen Castle. Robert the Bruce made an annual payment to the village in gratitude for the treatment of his wife's body and its return south for burial. In 2000, the recent non-payment of this sum by the government was challenged and settled to the village's favour.

The village is noted for Cullen Skink (a traditional soup made from smoked haddock, milk, potato and onion) and its former railway bridges, two of which are now part of the national cycle network. These bridges were required to be built, at considerable cost, due to resistance to the railway line being routed any closer to Cullen House. The most westerly (and by far the longest) viaduct is highly photogenic, and often features in tourist guides and Scottish calendars. Near Cullen is the peak Bin Hill, visible from some distance, such as from Longman Hill.

History

Cullen has a very long history, and a remarkably well-documented one thanks to the survival of a number of sources. These are summarised in two key books: the Annals of Cullen by W Crammond (1904) and the Church Annals of Cullen by W Robertson (1938). The first deals primarily with the civil governance and the latter with church governance up to the disruption. Cullen received royal burgh status between 1153 and 1214 AD during the reigns of Malcolm IV and William I. It is also known to have received a charter in 1455 AD from James II. The burgh was abolished in 1975 by the Local Government (Scotland) Act 1973.

Writing in around 139–161, Ptolemy in his Geography mentions the River Celnius in the North East of Scotland. Both William Forbes Skene and George Chalmers identified the Celnius with Cullen Burn. The first mention of Cullen in Scottish history was in 962 when King Indulf was killed by the Norwegians (and/or Danes) at the mouth of the river Cullen and referred to as the Battle of the Bauds. "Atween Coedlich and the sea, There lies Kings' sons three." Legend has it that within the vicinity, a Scots, a Danish and a Norwegian King are buried, marked by the three isolated rocks within Cullen Bay and named the "Three Kings". However, it is possible that these rocks derive their name from the similarity of the name Cullen with Culane (Cologne) as in the medieval mystery play "The Three Kings of Culane".

The church was founded as a chapel by King Robert the Bruce.

The organs of the wife of King Robert the Bruce are said to have been buried in its old kirk (church) after her death in the area;the King then made an annual payment to the village in gratitude for the treatment of his wife's body and its return south for burial. This payment was stopped after a 1975 reform of Scottish local government. In 2000, the non-payment of this sum was challenged and settled to the village's favour.

Robert Burns stayed overnight at, what was then, the old town of Cullen in 1787 during his tour of the Highlands. Travelling from the west to the east he remarked that up to this point, the country is sadly poor and unimproved.
The old town of Cullen was demolished in 1822 and its remains are next to Cullen House. It was under James Ogilvy, 7th Earl of Findlater that plans were first mooted for moving the town, but it was not until his successor Lewis Grant-Ogilvy, 5th Earl of Seafield that the plans were enacted. The new town was planned by George MacWilliam, and built between 1820 and 1822.

The central market cross in the town square originally stood in the old town. During the building of the new town it was temporarily erected at the top of the ancient fort structure that guards the entrance to the Cullen Burn (stream), known as the Castle Hill. This resulted in the present layout of the village, a generous cross shape of two major streets, Seafield Street and Grant Street, with a central town square and "the Seatown" sandwiched on the false beach between the mouth of the Cullen Burn and the harbour. In the previous layout the town was spread along a road above and parallel to the Cullen Burn, running between the Castle Hill and Cullen House, the Seatown being at the mouth of the Burn where boats used to be pulled up onto the beach. The most prominent building in the new town is Cullen Town Hall which was completed in 1823.

The fishing industry developed quickly in the 1880s and the harbour was crammed with large sailing fishing boats, these giving way to steam drifters at the start of the 20th century. The industry became centralised on larger harbours, the boats became larger diesel-engined designs that required non-tidal access. The site of Cullen railway station was redeveloped after the station closed in 1968.

The main part of Cullen House dates from 1543. An east wing was added in 1711, and there were alterations by David Bryce in 1858. The House and estate buildings were converted into 14 dwellings in 1983 by Kit Martin.

Features

The village now has a population of 1,327. Cullen is noticeably busier in summer than winter due to the number of holiday homes owned. 
The village has an impressive beach and golf course, and the Crannoch wood which offers good views of the area. The  Bin Hill or Bin of Cullen is a nearby hill with an associated footpath.

Cullen was the setting for Doris Davidson's romantic novel The Three Kings, named after the three rocks at the east end of Cullen beach. The local writer Simon Farquhar set his first two plays, Candy Floss Kisses and Elevenses with Twiggy, in the village and they were produced by BBC Radio 4. Samuel Johnson had less passion for Cullen. According to James Boswell, writing in The Journal of a Tour to the Hebrides, the pair considered that Cullen had "a comfortable appearance, though but a very small town, and the houses mostly poor buildings". Dr Johnson was also "disgusted by the sight of" the "dried haddocks broiled" that they were served for breakfast there and refused to eat them. Of course, given the general views aired so freely by Dr Johnson, this is mild indeed.

See also
Boards Of Canada music group

References

External links 

Villages in Moray
Ports and harbours of Scotland
Royal burghs